The 2019-20 Rugby Africa Cup is the first season of a restructuring of international rugby union competition by Rugby Africa after a loss of broadcast sponsorship caused the cancellation of the 2019 Rugby Africa Gold Cup, itself only the third edition of a previous restructuring of the continent's tournament.

The new Rugby Africa Cup replaces the multi-tiered Gold, Silver, and Bronze Cups with a seeded group stage followed by a knockout round. This results in fewer matches being played, but also greatly reduced costs and travel times from the round-robin Gold Cup.

The group stage of the tournament was cancelled due to the COVID-19 pandemic.

Structure

The top sixteen nations in African rugby enter the competition, with the bottom eight entering in the elimination stage. Each team plays a single match and the four winners move onto the group stage, with four groups of three. The four group winners then enter the semi-finals.

Seeding

The sixteen participating teams were seeded as follows:

(World Rankings taken from November 13, 2019)

Elimination stage

The elimination stage matches will be played from November to December 2019

 Elimination 1 

 Elimination 2 

 Elimination 3 

 Elimination 4

Group stage

The group stage will be held from June-July 2020

Group A

Group B
2019-2020 Rugby Africa Gold Cup

Group C

Group D

Knock-Out Stage

References

2019–20
2019 rugby union tournaments for national teams
2019 in African rugby union
2020 rugby union tournaments for national teams
2020 in African rugby union